National Highway 129A, commonly referred to as NH 129A is a national highway in  India. It is a spur road of National Highway 29. NH-129A traverses the states of Manipur and Nagaland in India.

Route 

 Nagaland

Dimapur, Razaphe Junction, Pimla Junction, Jaluki, Peren, Manipur border.

 Manipur

Nagaland Border - Maram.

Junctions 

  Terminal near Dimapur.
  near Maram.

See also 

 List of National Highways in India
 List of National Highways in India by state

References

External links 

 NH 129A on OpenStreetMap

National highways in India
National Highways in Manipur
National Highways in Nagaland